Fuxingmen Outer Street is a major street in urban Beijing. It forms part of the extended Chang'an Avenue.

It starts at Fuxing Road in the west and ends at Fuxingmen Bridge in the east.

It is a major commercial hub of Beijing, dwarfed only by its more eastern counterparts -- Xidan and Wangfujing.

The Chang'an Market lies in this location.

Until 2003, the nationwide committee building of the All-China National Trade Union sat along the street for 50 years until it was detonated and demolished. A new building is expected in a few years' time.

Line 1 of the Beijing subway runs along the route.

Streets in Beijing